Three congresses have been held at Aix-la-Chapelle:
 Congress of Aix-la-Chapelle (1668)
 Congress of Aix-la-Chapelle (1748)
 Congress of Aix-la-Chapelle (1818)